Daniel Gittard (March 14, 1625 – December 15, 1686) was a French architect.

Biography
Daniel Gittard was born in Blandy-les-Tours. He died in Paris.

In 1671, he became one of the first eight members of the Académie royale d'architecture created by Louis XIV.

External links
 Structurae entry

17th-century French architects
Members of the Académie royale d'architecture
1625 births
1686 deaths